Kanifnath (मराठी: कानिफनाथ) also known as Kanhoba (कान्होबा), is a Hindu saint. He is one of the nine Mahayogis of Navnath Sampradaya. Kanifnath is Maharashtrian version of the name Kanhapad, a Siddha poet.

Kanifnath is considered as an avatar of Prabuddha Narayan in one of Nav Narayan. He was a son of Shri Vrishabha Deva mentioned in Bhagavata Purana.
Lord Kanifnath was a yogi belong to the Jalandhar branch of Natha Sampradaya. He was disciple of Jalandhara.

Sources
Official Website of Kanifnath Devsthan Trust, Madhi: http://www.kanifnathmadhi.org/

Characters in Hindu mythology
Navnath